Jason Martin (born September 5, 1995) is an American professional baseball outfielder for the NC Dinos of the KBO League. He previously played in Major League Baseball (MLB) for the Pittsburgh Pirates, Texas Rangers, and the Los Angeles Dodgers.

Amateur career
Martin attended Orange Lutheran High School in Orange, California.

Professional career

Houston Astros
He was drafted by the Houston Astros in the eighth round of the 2013 Major League Baseball Draft. He signed and spent 2013 with the Gulf Coast Astros where he batted .251 with 17 RBIs and 11 stolen bases in 50 games. In 2014, he played for both the Greeneville Astros and Tri-City ValleyCats, slashing .257/.338/.384 with one home run and 23 RBIs in 63 total games between the two teams, and in 2015, he played with the Quad Cities River Bandits where he compiled a .270 batting average with eight home runs and 57 RBIs in 105 games. Martin spent 2016 with the Lancaster JetHawks and slashed .270/.357/.533 with 23 home runs and 75 RBIs in 110 games.

After the 2016 season, Martin played for the Glendale Desert Dogs of the Arizona Fall League. In 2017, he played for the Buies Creek Astros and Corpus Christi Hooks and batted .278 with 18 home runs, 66 RBIs, 35 doubles, and 16 stolen bases in 125 games.

Pittsburgh Pirates
On January 13, 2018, Martin was traded to the Pittsburgh Pirates (along with Joe Musgrove, Colin Moran and Michael Feliz) for Gerrit Cole. He began 2018 with the Altoona Curve and was promoted to the Indianapolis Indians in June. In 127 total games between the two teams, he slashed .274/.337/.429 with 13 home runs and 55 RBIs.

The Pirates added Martin to their 40-man roster after the season. On April 5, 2019, Martin was promoted to the major league roster for the first time. He made his major league debut on April 6, recording a single versus Tanner Roark in his first major league at bat.  Martin joined Andrew McCutchen and Jose Tabata as the only Pirates since 1948 to record a hit, a run, and a stolen base in their Major League debut. In his rookie season, Martin collected nine hits in 40 trips to the plate. On October 18, 2019, Martin underwent surgery to repair a left shoulder labral tear.

He only appeared in 7 games in 2020, going hitless in 9 at-bats. On October 30, 2020, Martin was outrighted off of the 40-man roster. He became a free agent on November 2, 2020.

Texas Rangers
On December 14, 2020, Martin signed a minor league contract with the Texas Rangers organization. On May 26, 2021, Martin was selected to the active roster. He hit first MLB home run, a 2-run homer, against Los Angeles Dodgers second baseman Andy Burns on June 12. Over 58 games for Texas in 2021, Martin hit .208/.248/.354/.603	with 6 home runs and 17 RBI. On October 9, Martin elected free agency.

Los Angeles Dodgers
On November 23, 2021, Martin signed a minor league contract with the Los Angeles Dodgers. He spent the season with the Triple-A Oklahoma City Dodgers, where he played in 129 games, with a .285 batting average, 32 homers and 107 RBIs. He elected free agency on November 10, 2022.

NC Dinos 
On December 3, 2022, Martin signed a contract with the NC Dinos of the KBO League

References

External links

1995 births
Living people
Sportspeople from Corona, California
Baseball players from California
Major League Baseball outfielders
Pittsburgh Pirates players
Texas Rangers players
Gulf Coast Astros players
Greeneville Astros players
Tri-City ValleyCats players
Quad Cities River Bandits players
Lancaster JetHawks players
Buies Creek Astros players
Corpus Christi Hooks players
Altoona Curve players
Indianapolis Indians players
Round Rock Express players
Glendale Desert Dogs players
Oklahoma City Dodgers players